The Luisin is a mountain of the Chablais Alps, overlooking Les Marécottes in the canton of Valais. It lies east of the Tour Sallière, on the range between the lake of Salanfe and the valley of Trient.

References

External links
 Luisin on Summitpost

Mountains of the Alps
Mountains of Valais
Mountains of Switzerland
Two-thousanders of Switzerland